Elections to Liverpool City Council were held on 1 November 1936. One third of the council seats were up for election, the term of office of each councillor being three years.

Six of the thirty nine seats up for election were uncontested.

After the election for the councillors and the aldermanic election (held on 9 November 1936), the composition of the council was:

Election result

Ward results

* - Councillor seeking re-election

Comparisons are made with the 1933 election results.

Abercromby

Aigburth

Allerton

Anfield

Breckfield

Brunswick

Castle Street

Childwall

Croxteth

Dingle

Edge Hill

Everton

Exchange

Fairfield

Fazakerley

Garston

Granby

Great George

Kensington

Kirkdale

Low Hill

Much Woolton

Netherfield

North Scotland

Old Swan

Prince's Park

Sandhills

St. Anne's

St. Domingo

St. Peter's

Sefton Park East

Sefton Park West

South Scotland

Vauxhall

Walton

Warbreck

Wavertree

Wavertree West

West Derby

Aldermanic Elections

Aldermanic Election 6 January 1937

Caused by the death on 1 December 1936 of Alderman Patrick Jeremiah Kelly (Independent, last elected by the councillors as an alderman on 9 November 1932, in whose place Councillor Lawrence King (Labour, elected 1 November 1935) was elected as an alderman by the councillors on 6 January 1937.

The term of office to expire on 9 November 1938.

Aldermanic Election 3 February 1937

Caused by the resignation of Alderman Anthony Shelmerdine (Conservative, elected 9 November 1932), in whose place Councillor Michael Cory Dixon (Conservative, elected 1 November 1935) being elected as an alderman on 3 February 1937.

The term of office to expire on 9 November 1938.

Aldermanic Election 6 October 1937

Caused by the death on 7 September 1937 of Alderman Henry Walker (Labour, last elected as an alderman on 9 November 1935). His place was taken by Councillor John Wolfe Tone Morrissey JP (Labour, last elected to the Sandhills ward on 1 November 1936) of 17 Haverstock Road, Fairfield, Liverpool, who was elected by the councillors as an alderman on 6 October 1937.

The term of office to expire on 9 November 1941.

By-elections

No. 33 Wavertree West, Wednesday 27 January 1937

Caused by the resignation of Councillor Charlton Thomson (Conservative, elected 1 November 1935).

The term of office to expire on 1 November 1938.

No.11 Brunswick, 11 February 1937

Following the death on 1 December 1936 of Alderman Patrick Jeremiah Kelly (Independent, last elected by the councillors as an alderman on 9 November 1932, in whose place Councillor Lawrence King (Labour, elected 1 November 1935) was elected as an alderman by the councillors on 6 January 1937.

The term of office to expire on 1 November 1938.

No.15 Sefton Park East, 17 March 1937

Caused by Councillor Michael Cory Dixon (Conservative, elected 1 November 1935) being elected as an alderman on 3 February 1937.

The term of office to expire on 1 November 1938.

No. 14 Granby, Thursday 17 June 1937

Caused by the death on 28 April 1937 of Councillor William Adam Edwards (Conservative, last elected 1 November 1936)

No. 40 Croxteth, Thursday 17 June 1937

Caused by the resignation of Councillor Mrs. Mary Lilian Hamilton (Labour, last elected 1 November 1936).

The term of office to expire on 1 November 1939.

No. 19 Kensington, Thursday 22 July 1937

Caused by the death on 28 June 1937 of Councillor Edward Clouston Ralph Litler-Jones (Conservative, elected 1 November 1935.

See also

 Liverpool City Council
 Liverpool Town Council elections 1835 - 1879
 Liverpool City Council elections 1880–present
 Mayors and Lord Mayors of Liverpool 1207 to present
 History of local government in England

References

1936
1936 English local elections
1930s in Liverpool